The Mountain Regional Library System (MRLS) is a public library system consisting of four branches in Fannin County, Towns County, and Union County, Georgia, United States.

MRLS is a member of PINES, a program of the Georgia Public Library Service that covers 53 library systems in 143 counties of Georgia. Any resident in a PINES supported library system has access to over 10.6 million books in the system's circulation. The library is also serviced by GALILEO, a program of the University System of Georgia which stands for "GeorgiA LIbrary LEarning Online". This program offers residents in supported libraries access to over 100 databases indexing thousands of periodicals and scholarly journals. It also boasts over 10,000 journal titles in full text.

History
The Mountain Regional Library System originated as a small public library to service the counties of Towns and Union, Georgia. This library, aptly named the Towns-Union Regional Library, was founded in 1946 by both the counties, as well as Young Harris College, which agreed to sponsor and provide space for the library in its infancy. The library thus was originally set up in the Rich Building on Young Harris College's campus.

By 1957, Fannin County was added to the regional library changing its name to the lengthy Fannin-Towns-Union Regional Library. In the following year, 1958, this name was shortened to the current Mountain Regional Library System. The Fannin branch built their new facility in the library system in 1973 in Blue Ridge.

In 2010 the Union County Public Library in Blairsville renovated its building, adding a genealogy room, community room, and used book store. It is currently the most visited library in the system. By 2014 the Towns County Public Library in Hiawassee also underwent renovations, costing $1 million, to completely refurbish the building and update it to modern standards.

Library systems in neighboring counties
Northwest Georgia Regional Library System to the west
Sequoyah Regional Library System to the south west
Chestatee Regional Library System to the south
Northeast Georgia Regional Library System to the east

References

External links
PINES catalog

County library systems in Georgia (U.S. state)
Public libraries in Georgia (U.S. state)